Latvian Braille is the braille alphabet of the Latvian language.

Alphabet
The alphabet is as follows. It uses international w for v. All Latvian print diacritics are indicated by dot 6 in Latvian Braille; the international forms of u, v, and z have been abandoned to allow this to be a regular rule (compared to say Lithuanian Braille, which has a separate convention for such letters).

Punctuation

Formatting

References

French-ordered braille alphabets
Latvian language